Song to a Seagull (also known as Joni Mitchell) is the debut studio album by Canadian singer-songwriter Joni Mitchell. Produced by David Crosby, the album was recorded in early 1968 at Sunset Sound and released on March 23, 1968 by Reprise Records.

Production
The album was recorded at Sunset Sound in Hollywood, California. David Crosby was assigned as producer as part of the deal with Reprise Records, following meeting Mitchell in October 1967. Crosby wanted Mitchell to sound pure and natural, so he asked her to sing into the studio grand piano, and set up extra microphones to capture her voice reverberating off the strings; unfortunately the set-up captured too much ambient noise, resulting in excessive tape hiss, which could only be removed post-production at the cost of the high sounds in the audio range, which gives the album a flat feel.

Mitchell had written songs that were hits for other artists (e.g., "Both Sides Now" and "Chelsea Morning" by Judy Collins and Dave Van Ronk, "Eastern Rain" by Fairport Convention, "Urge for Going" and "The Circle Game" by Tom Rush), but none of those songs were recorded for her debut.

Content
Mitchell has said that "Sisotowbell" stands for "Somehow, in spite of trouble, ours will be ever lasting love".

The album was dedicated to her Grade 7 English teacher, "Mr. Kratzmann, who taught me to love words".

Release
This album was originally released as Joni Mitchell because the LP album covers were printed incorrectly, cutting off part of the Song to a Seagull title (spelled out by birds in flight). The cut-off, as well as the publishers at Reprise Records not noticing that the birds spelled out the album name, caused the eponymous album title.

The two sides of the LP were labelled as Part 1 – "I Came to the City", and Part 2 – "Out of the City and Down to the Seaside".

On April 8, 2021, Rhino Entertainment, the catalog arm of Warner Music Group, announced that a new mix of the album overseen by Mitchell and mixer Matt Lee would be released on June 25, 2021 as part of a special remaster collection comprising the singer's first four albums. Commenting on the quality of the original mix, Mitchell called it "atrocious" and said it "sounded like it was recorded under a Jello bowl". The remastered collection is part of the ongoing Joni Mitchell Archives project.

Track listing

Personnel
 Joni Mitchell – guitar, piano, vocals, album cover, banshee
 Stephen Stills – bass on "Night in the City"
 Lee Keefer – banshee

Technical
 David Crosby – producer
 Art Crist – engineer
 Ed Thrasher – art direction

Charts

Other versions and covers

Cass Elliot covered two songs from the album: "Sisotowbell Lane" and "I Had a King". Elliot sang "I Had a King" "live" on Andy Williams's Kaleidoscope in 1968. Neither song has ever been released on any of Elliot's seven albums. "Sisotowbell Lane" can be found on the CD compilation The Complete Solo Collection – 1968–71, released in 2005.

Judy Collins covered "Michael from Mountains" on her LP Wildflowers, as did Gábor Szabó on his LP 1969. Buffy Sainte-Marie recorded "Song to a Seagull" on her album Fire & Fleet & Candlelight issued in 1967.

References

External links

 

Joni Mitchell albums
1968 debut albums
Albums produced by David Crosby
Albums recorded at Sunset Sound Recorders
Albums with cover art by Joni Mitchell
Concept albums
Reprise Records albums